Cotton is a soft, staple fiber that can be spun and woven into a textile of the same name.

Cotton may also refer to:
Gossypium, the cotton plant

Geography

United Kingdom
Cotton, Cheshire, a village in Cheshire
Cotton Edmunds, a village in Cheshire
Cotton End, a village in Bedfordshire
Cotton End, Northampton, a suburb  
Cotton, Staffordshire, a village in the Staffordshire Moorlands, England
Cotton, Suffolk, an English civil parish
Cotton, County Down, a townland in County Down, Northern Ireland
Far Cotton, a suburb of Northampton

United States
Cotton, Georgia
Cotton, Minnesota
Cotton, West Virginia
Cotton County, Oklahoma

People

Given name
Cotton Fitzsimmons (1931–2004), American basketball coach
Cotton Mather (1663-1728), New England Puritan

Nickname
 Cotton (nickname), a list of people with the nickname

Surname
Cotton (surname), a list of people with the surname

Business and organizations
Cotton (motorcycle), British motorcycle manufacturer
Cotton Incorporated, fabric organization

Art, entertainment, and media
Cotton library, the collection of medieval manuscripts by Robert Bruce Cotton
Cotton (album)
Cotton (series), a video game series
Cotton: Fantastic Night Dreams, the first game in the series
Cotton Hill, a character on King of the Hill

See also
Cotton Patch Goose, a breed of domestic goose
Coton (disambiguation)
Cotten